Godøya or Godøy is an island in Giske Municipality in Møre og Romsdal county, Norway.

The  island had 1,117 residents in 2015. Godøy Chapel is located on the southern coast of the island.

There is a lot of cultivated farm land along the shores. Fishing and fish processing are the main industries for the island.  There is an undersea tunnel, the Godøy Tunnel, which connects Godøy to the neighboring island of Giske. Tunel was renovated in 2009. There is further ferry-free road transportation (including the Giske Bridge) that connects the island to the town of Ålesund.

A variety of wildlife can be found on the island, mammals such as Red deer, Roe deer, Otter, Harbour seal and American mink are predominant. The steep mountain sides of the island also contain a number of nesting White-tailed eagles.

Name
The name stems back to the Viking Age, and is derived from the name "Gud øy", which translates to "Island of God(s)" in English. The current name, Godøya, can be loosely translated to "the good island".

See also
List of islands of Norway

References

Giske
Islands of Møre og Romsdal